The 1930–31 Scottish Second Division was won by Third Lanark who, along with second placed Dundee United, were promoted to the First Division. Bo'ness finished bottom.

Table

References 

 Scottish Football Archive

Scottish Division Two seasons
2
Scot